The Arsenal is a symmetrical brick building with modestly Gothic Revival details, located in Central Park in New York City adjacent to the Central Park Zoo. It is centered on 64th Street west of Fifth Avenue. Built between 1847 and 1851 as a storehouse for arms and ammunition for the New York State Militia, the building is the second-oldest extant structure that was constructed within Central Park, predating the park's construction; only the 1814 Blockhouse No. 1 is older.

The Arsenal was designed by Martin E. Thompson, originally trained as a carpenter, who had been a partner of Ithiel Town and went on to become one of the founders of the National Academy of Design. Thompson's symmetrical structure of brick in English bond, with headers every fifth course, presents a central block in the manner of a fortified gatehouse flanked by half-octagonal towers. The carpentry doorframe speaks of its purpose with a bald eagle displayed between stacks of cannonballs over the door, and crossed sabers and stacked pikes represented in flanking panels. The lobby contains a series of floor-to-ceiling murals by Allen Saalburg from 1935-36, combining historical vignettes of New York life during the Civil War with ornamental scrolls and arabesques.

The building currently houses the offices of the New York City Department of Parks and Recreation and the nearby Central Park Zoo, but it has also served as a zoo and housed the American Museum of Natural History's collections while the museum's permanent structure was being erected.  During the course of its lifetime it has also housed a police precinct, a weather bureau, and an art gallery.

See also
 List of armories and arsenals in New York City and surrounding counties

References

New York Times article
Central Park Website article
History of The Arsenal article from the New York City Department of Parks & Recreation

Central Park
American Museum of Natural History
Arsenals
1851 establishments in New York (state)
New York City Designated Landmarks in Manhattan